The Make-Up Artists and Hair Stylists Guild is an American labor union representing make-up artists and hair stylists in feature films, television programs, commercials, live network events and theatrical productions in the United States. The members of the union have been acknowledged by various honorary organizations dedicated to the arts, and have won numerous Academy Awards, Emmy Awards, BAFTAs, and Saturn Awards. The Make-Up Artists and Hair Stylists Guild was chartered in 1937. It is Local 706 of the IATSE.

Karen Westerfield was elected in 2022 as the first Asian-American and the first woman to be the business representative of the union. Business representative is the top job at the union.

Make-Up Artists and Hair Stylists Guild Awards
The union organizes annual Make-Up Artists & Hair Stylists Guild Awards. In 2016, the awards were divided into 19 different categories. The union also gives Lifetime Achievement Awards to honour the outstanding achievements in the industry, as well as a special Distinguished Artisan Award given to an actor or a filmmaker for their creative contributions.

Award categories
Feature Motion Picture
Best Contemporary Make-Up
Best Contemporary Hair Styling
Best Period and/or Character Make-Up
Best Period and/or Character Hair Styling
Best Special Make-Up Effects
Television and New Media Series
Best Contemporary Make-Up
Best Contemporary Hair Styling
Best Period and/or Character Make-Up
Best Period and/or Character Hair Styling
Best Special Make-Up Effects
Motion Pictures Made for Television or Specials
Best Contemporary Make-Up
Best Contemporary Hair Styling
Best Period and/or Character Make-Up
Best Period and/or Character Hair Styling
Best Special Make-Up Effects
Commercials and Music Videos
Best Make-Up
Best Hair Styling
Theatrical Production
Best Make-Up
Best Hair Styling
Children and Teen Programming
Best Make-Up
Best Hair Styling
Daytime Television
Best Make-Up
Best Hair Styling

See also
 Society of Makeup Artists

References

External links 
 
 Make-Up Artists & Hair Stylists Guild Awards

 
Entertainment industry societies
Film organizations in the United States
Guilds in the United States
Hairdressing
Makeup